The Finance, General Economy and Budgetary Monitoring Committee (usually known as the Finance Committee) is one of the eight standing committees of the French National Assembly. It is traditionally chaired by a member of the largest opposition party.

Chairs 

 Éric Coquerel - 16th legislature of the French Fifth Republic

References 

Economy of France
Committees of the National Assembly (France)